The Massachusetts Board of Elementary and Secondary Education (BESE) is the state education agency responsible for interpreting and implementing laws relevant to public education in the Commonwealth of Massachusetts. Public education in the Commonwealth is organized according to the regulations adopted by the BESE, which are good faith interpretations of Massachusetts state and federal law. The BESE's responsibilities include granting and renewing charter school applications, developing and implementing the Massachusetts Comprehensive Assessment System (MCAS), submitting yearly budget proposals for public education to the Massachusetts General Court, setting the standards for and certifying teachers, principals, and superintendents, and monitoring—as well as intervening to ameliorate—the achievement of underperforming districts in the Commonwealth.

History

The board was established in 1837 and is the second oldest state board of education in the United States. Governor Edward Everett had recommended the establishment of a board of education in his address to the 1837 legislature's opening session. His brief argument ran as follows:
While nothing can be further from my purpose, than to disparage the common schools as they are, and while a deep sense of personal obligation to them will ever be cherished by me, it must yet be candidly admitted that they are susceptible of great improvements. The school houses might, in many cases, be rendered more commodious. Provision ought to be made for affording the advantages of education, throughout the whole year, to all of a proper age to receive it. Teachers well qualified to give elementary instruction in all the branches of useful knowledge, should be employed; and small school libraries, maps, globes, and requisite scientific apparatus should be furnished. I submit to the Legislature, whether the creation of a board of commissioners of schools, to serve without salary, with authority to appoint a secretary, on a reasonable compensation, to be paid from the school fund, would not be of great utility.
The legislature's Committee on Education, led by Senate chairman Josiah Quincy, Jr. and House chairman James G. Carter, sponsored a bill which was initially soundly defeated in the House. Largely as a result of efforts by Mr. Carter, the bill was eventually passed. Horace Mann, President of the Massachusetts State Senate at the time, was appointed the board's first Secretary.

Composition
The BESE is composed of 11 members: 10 are appointed by the governor, including his Secretary of Education, who serves ex officio, and one is a public school student elected by his or her peers. The 11 voting members are: "the chairman of the student advisory council established under this section; 1 representative of a labor organization selected by the governor from a list of 3 nominees provided by the Massachusetts State Labor Council, AFL–CIO; 1 representative of business or industry selected by the governor with a demonstrated commitment to education; 1 representative of parents of school children selected by the governor from a list of 3 nominees provided by the Massachusetts Parent Teachers Association; and 6 members selected by the governor." The Chairperson of the BOE is appointed by the governor. The secretary of the BESE must be approved by a two thirds vote and serves at the Board's pleasure as the chief executive officer, the Chief State School Officer for Elementary and Secondary Education, and the Commissioner of Elementary and Secondary Education. The Commissioner attends BESE meetings, but does not vote. He is responsible for managing the Massachusetts Department of Elementary and Secondary Education and receives a salary which is determined by the Board.

Prior to legislation introduced by Governor Patrick in 2008, the BESE was composed of 9 voting members.

Advisory Councils
A number of Advisory Councils, created by Chapter 15: Section 1G of the General Laws of Massachusetts, support the Board with research, recommendations and—in the case of the Student Advisory Counci—is represented by a voting member of the Board. The advisory councils include:

 Adult Basic Education 
 Arts Education 
 Community Service Learning 
 Braille Literacy Advisory Council 
 Digital Learning Advisory Council 
 Educational Personnel 
 English Language Learners/Bilingual Education 
 Gifted and Talented Education 
 Global Education 
 Interdisciplinary Health Education and Human Services 
 Life Management Skills and Home Economics 
 Parent and Community Education and Involvement 
 Racial Imbalance 
 School and District Accountability and Assistance 
 Science, Technology/Engineering and Mathematics 
 Special Education 
 Student Advisory Council 
 Vocational Technical Education

Student membership
The BESE is unique in that 1 of its 9 members is a Massachusetts public school student. Legislation filed in 1971 by Governor Francis W. Sargent created the position. By this same legislation, the Massachusetts State Student Advisory Council was established. The Chairperson of this Council sits as a full voting member on the BESE. Governor Sargent said at the filing of the bill, "If we are to replace confrontation with deliberation and shouting with dialogue, youth must be invited in, not shut out. We have ... a climate where young and old can sit together, talk, and listen."

The current student member of the Board is Eleni Livingston. Her term will end in July 2022.

Current members
Katherine Craven, Chair,  Babson Park
James Morton, Vice-Chair, Boston 
James Peyser, Secretary of Education
Jeff Riley, Commissioner of Elementary and Secondary Education, Secretary to the Board

Amanda Fernandez
Matt Hills
Michael Moriarty
Paymon Rouhanifard
Mary Ann Stewart 
Jasper Coughlin
Marty West

Notable former members
Charlie Baker
George S. Boutwell – Secretary (1855–1860)
Jeremiah E. Burke
James G. Carter
George H. Conley
Horace Mann – First secretary of the board (1837–1848)
Paul Reville – Secretary of Education
Barnas Sears – Secretary (1848–1855)
John Silber, Chair
Abigail Thernstrom
Kate Gannett Wells

References

Further reading
  1837–1923, fulltext

External links
 http://www.doe.mass.edu/bese/
 http://www.doe.mass.edu/

Board of Elementary and Secondary Education
1837 establishments in Massachusetts
State boards of education in the United States